Pietri or Piétri is a surname. Notable people with the surname include:

 Alicia Pietri Montemayor (1923–2011), wife of Venezuelan president Rafael Caldera
 Annie Pietri (born 1956), French writer. 
 Arturo Uslar Pietri, Venezuelan intellectual, lawyer, journalist, writer, television producer and politician
 A.S.D. Boca Pietri, Italian association football club from Bologna,
 Dorando Pietri,  Italian athlete
 Eugenio de Bellard Pietri, noted speleologist
 François Piétri, French politician of the 20th century
 Frank Pietri, American Jazz Instructor, choreographer and performer
 Giuseppe Pietri (1886–1946), Italian composer
 Joseph Marie Piétri (1820–1902), French lawyer, public servant, police chief of Paris and senator
 Julie Pietri (born 1955), French pop singer
 Pedro Pietri, Nuyorican poet and playwright
 Pietro da Pietri, Italian painter of the late-Baroque period
 Rafael Pietri Oms, University of Puerto Rico chancellor
 Rick Pietri, head women's basketball coach at the University of South Alabama
 Robertino Pietri (born 1985), Grand Prix motorcycle racer from Venezuela

Italian-language surnames
Surnames from given names